France Bleu Roussillon is a public radio station, part of the France Bleu network which is owned by Radio France covering the Pyrénées-Orientales (Roussillon) department. It generally covers local news, across Occitania and in Pyrénées-Orientales. The site features a newsletter, and there is a function available to search what song is playing on the radio.

Flagship radio shows 
As with the other local France Bleu radio stations, France Bleu Roussillon also has its own flagship radio shows, covering various topics, such as local news, foods, culture, etc.

These are the following flagship radio shows available, as of April 1, 2022:

Dans ma rue (In my street) - Monday to Friday, 6.11AM, 8.16AM, and 4.19PM.
Circuit court en Roussillon (Short circuit in Roussillon) - Monday to Friday, 7.55AM.
Suivez le guide - Le Mag (Follow the guide - The Magazine) - Sunday at 11.03AM.

References

External links
France Bleu
Radio France Website

Radio stations in France
Radio stations established in 1945
Radio France
1945 establishments in France